Alice Walker (born 1944) is an American novelist, poet, and social activist.

Alice Walker may also refer to:
 Alice Walker (fencer) (1876–1954), British Olympian
 Alice Walker (scholar)  (1900–1982), British literary scholar
 Alice Leslie Walker (1885–1954), American archeologist

See also
 Alice Walker: Beauty in Truth, a documentary film about the novelist